The following is a list of Daijō-daijin.

Nara Period
 671-672 Prince Ōtomo (大友皇子) (648-672)
 690-696 Prince Takechi (高市皇子) (654-696)
 703-705 Prince Osakabe (刑部親王) (?-705) - Chi-Daijō-kanji (知太政官事)
 705-715 Prince Hozumi (穂積親王) (?-715) - Chi-Daijō-kanji (知太政官事)
 720-735 Prince Toneri (舎人親王) (676-735) - Chi-Daijō-kanji (知太政官事)
 737-745 Prince Suzuka (鈴鹿王) (?-745) - Chi-Daijō-kanji (知太政官事)
 760-764 Emi no Oshikatsu (恵美押勝) (Fujiwara no Nakamaro) (藤原仲麻呂) (706-764) - Taishi (太師)
 765-766 Dōkyō (道鏡) (700?-772)

Heian Period
 857-872 Fujiwara no Yoshifusa (藤原良房) (804-872) (Chūjin-kō, 忠仁公)
 880-891 Fujiwara no Mototsune (藤原基経) (836-891) (Shōsen-kō, 昭宣公)
 936-949 Fujiwara no Tadahira (藤原忠平) (880-949) (Teishin-kō, 貞信公)
 967-970 Fujiwara no Saneyori (藤原実頼) (900-970) (Seishin-kō, 清慎公)
 971-972 Fujiwara no Koretada (藤原伊尹) (924-972) (Kentoku-kō, 謙徳公)
 974-977 Fujiwara no Kanemichi (藤原兼通) (925-977) (Chūgi-kō, 忠義公)
 978-989 Fujiwara no Yoritada (藤原頼忠) (924-989) (Rengi-kō, 廉義公)
 990 Fujiwara no Kaneie (藤原兼家) (929-990)
 991-992 Fujiwara no Tamemitsu (藤原為光) (942-992) (Kōtoku-kō, 恒徳公)
 1017-1018 Fujiwara no Michinaga (藤原道長) (966-1028)
 1021-1029 Fujiwara no Kinsue (藤原公季) (957-1029) (Jingi-kō, 仁義公)
 1061-1062 Fujiwara no Yorimichi (藤原頼通) (992-1074)
 1070-1071 Fujiwara no Norimichi (藤原教通) (996-1075)
 1080-1089 Fujiwara no Nobunaga (藤原信長) (1022-1094)
 1112-1113 Fujiwara no Tadazane (藤原忠実) (1079-1162)
 1122-1124 Minamoto no Masazane (源雅実) (1059-1127)
 1129 Fujiwara no Tadamichi (藤原忠通) (1097-1164)
 1149-1150 Fujiwara no Tadamichi (藤原忠通) (1097-1164)
 1150-1157 Fujiwara no Saneyuki (藤原実行) (1080-1162) (Sanjō family, 三条家)
 1157-1160 Fujiwara no Munesuke (藤原宗輔) (1077-1162) (2nd son of Fujiwara no Munetoshi)
 1160-1165 Fujiwara no Koremichi (藤原伊通) (1093-1165) (2nd son of Fujiwara no Munemichi)
 1167 Taira no Kiyomori (平清盛) (1118-1181)
 1168-1170 Fujiwara no Tadamasa (藤原忠雅) (1124-1193) (Kazan'in family, 花山院家)
 1170-1171 Fujiwara no Motofusa (藤原基房) (1145-1231) (Matsudono family, 松殿家)
 1177-1179 Fujiwara no Moronaga (藤原師長) (1138-1192) (2nd son of Fujiwara no Yorinaga)
 1189-1190 Fujiwara no Kanezane (藤原兼実) (1149-1207) (Kujō family, 九条家)
 1191-1196 Fujiwara no Kanefusa (藤原兼房) (1153-1217)

Kamakura Period
 1199-1204 Fujiwara no Yorizane (藤原頼実) (1155-1225) (Ōimikado family, 大炊御門家)
 1205-1206 Fujiwara no Yoshitsune (藤原良経) (1169-1206) (Kujō family, 九条家)
 1218-1221 Fujiwara no Kinfusa (藤原公房) (1179-1249) (Sanjō family, 三条家)
 1221 Fujiwara no Michiie (藤原道家) (1193-1252) (Kujō family, 九条家)
 1221 Fujiwara no Kinfusa (藤原公房) (1179-1249) (Sanjō family, 三条家)
 1221 Fujiwara no Iezane (藤原家実) (1179-1243) (Konoe family, 近衛家)
 1222-1223 Fujiwara no Kintsune (藤原公経) (1171-1244) (Saionji family, 西園寺家)
 1238-1239 Fujiwara no Yoshihira (藤原良平) (1184-1240) (Kujō family, 九条家)
 1241-1242 Fujiwara no Kanetsune (藤原兼経) (1210-1259) (Konoe family, 近衛家)
 1246-1247 Fujiwara no Saneuji (藤原実氏) (1194-1269) (Saionji family, 西園寺家)
 1247-1248 Minamoto no Michimitsu (源通光) (1187-1248) (Koga family, 久我家) (3rd son of Minamoto no Michichika)
 1252-1253 Fujiwara no Kanehira (藤原兼平) (1228-1294) (Takatsukasa family, 鷹司家) (4th son of Fujiwara no Iezane)
 1253-1254 Fujiwara no Sanemoto (藤原実基) (1201-1273) (Tokudaiji family, 徳大寺家)
 1262 Fujiwara no Kinsuke (藤原公相) (1223-1267) (Saionji family, 西園寺家)
 1275-1276 Fujiwara no Michimasa (藤原通雅) (1233-1276) (Kazan'in family, 花山院家)
 1277 Fujiwara no Kanehira (藤原兼平) (1228-1294) (Takatsukasa family, 鷹司家)
 1285-1287 Fujiwara no Mototada (藤原基忠) (1247-1313) (Takatsukasa family, 鷹司家)
 1289-1290 Minamoto no Mototomo (源基具) (1230-1297) (Horikawa family, 堀川家)
 1292-1293 Fujiwara no Sanekane (藤原実兼) (1249-1322) (Saionji family, 西園寺家)
 1299 Fujiwara no Kinmori (藤原公守) (1249-1317) (Tōin family, 洞院家)
 1299-1300 Fujiwara no Kanemoto (藤原兼基) (1268-1334) (Nijō family, 二条家)
 1301-1302 Minamoto no Sadazane (源定実) (1240-1306) (Tsuchimikado family, 土御門家)
 1302-1304 Fujiwara no Kintaka (藤原公孝) (1253-1305) (Tokudaiji family, 徳大寺家)
 1307-1309 Fujiwara no Saneie (藤原実家) (1250-1314) (Ichijō family, 一条家)
 1309-1311 Fujiwara no Nobutsugu (藤原信嗣) (1236-1311) (Ōimikado family, 大炊御門家)
 1311 Fujiwara no Fuyuhira (藤原冬平) (1275-1327) (Takatsukasa family, 鷹司家)
 1318-1319 Fujiwara no Saneshige (藤原実重) (1259-1329) (Sanjō family, 三条家)
 1319-1323 Minamoto no Michio (源通雄) (1257-1329) (Koga family, 久我家)
 1323-1327 Fujiwara no Fuyuhira (藤原冬平) (1275-1327) (Takatsukasa family, 鷹司家)
 1332-1333 Fujiwara no Kanesue (藤原兼季) (1281-1339) (Imadegawa family, 今出川家) (4th son of Fujiwara no Sanekane)

Muromachi Period
 1341-1342 Minamoto no Nagamichi (源長通) (1280-1353) (Koga family, 久我家)
 1348-1350 Fujiwara no Kinkata (藤原公賢) (1291-1360) (Tōin family, 洞院家)
 1366-1368 Minamoto no Michisuke (源通相) (1326-1371) (Koga family, 久我家)
 1381-1387 Fujiwara no Yoshimoto (藤原良基) (1320-1388) (Nijō family, 二条家)
 1394 Fujiwara no Sanetoki (藤原実時) (1338-1404) (Tokudaiji family, 徳大寺家)
 1395 Minamoto no Yoshimitsu (源義満) (1358-1408) (Ashikaga family, 足利義満)
 1395-1396 Minamoto no Tomomichi (源具通) (1342-1397) (Koga family, 久我家)
 1402-1407 Fujiwara no Sanefuyu (藤原実冬) (1354-1411) (Sanjō family, 三条家)
 1420 Fujiwara no Kintoshi (藤原公俊) (1371-1428) (Tokudaiji family, 徳大寺家)
 1432-1433 Fujiwara no Mochimoto (藤原持基) (1390-1445) (Nijō family, 二条家)
 1446-1450 Fujiwara no Kaneyoshi (藤原兼良) (1402-1480) (Ichijō family, 一条家)
 1452-1453 Minamoto no Kiyomichi (源清通) (1393-1453) (Koga family, 久我家)
 1455-1457 Fujiwara no Kinna (藤原公名) (1410-1468) (Saionji family, 西園寺家)
 1458-1460 Fujiwara no Mochimichi (藤原持通) (1416-1493) (Nijō family, 二条家)
 1462-1463 Fujiwara no Fusatsugu (藤原房嗣) (1402-1488) (Konoe family, 近衛家)
 1481-1482 Minamoto no Michihiro (源通博) (1426-1482) (Koga family, 久我家)
 1485 Fujiwara no Masahira (藤原政平) (1445-1517) (Takatsukasa family, 鷹司家)
 1488-1490 Fujiwara no Masaie (藤原政家) (1444-1505) (Konoe family, 近衛家)
 1493-1497 Fujiwara no Fuyuyoshi (藤原冬良) (1464-1514) (Ichijō family, 一条家)
 1510-1511 Fujiwara no Saneatsu (藤原実淳) (1445-1533) (Tokudaiji family, 徳大寺家)
 1514-1517 Fujiwara no Hisamichi (藤原尚通) (1472-1544) (Konoe family, 近衛家)
 1518-1521 Fujiwara no Masanaga (藤原政長) (1451-1525) (Kazan'in family, 花山院家)
 1525-1533 Fujiwara no Taneie (藤原稙家) (1503-1566) (Konoe family, 近衛家)
 1535-1536 Fujiwara no Saneka (藤原実香) (1469-1558) (Sanjō family, 三条家)
 1538-1542 Fujiwara no Taneie (藤原稙家) (1503-1566) (Konoe family, 近衛家)
 1542-1545 Fujiwara no Tadafuyu (藤原忠冬) (1509-1546) (Takatsukasa family, 鷹司家)
 1545-1548 Fujiwara no Fusamichi (藤原房通) (1509-1556) (Ichijō family, 一条家)
 1548-1553 Fujiwara no Haruyoshi (藤原晴良) (1526-1579) (Nijō family, 二条家)
 1553-1568 ?

Azuchi-Momoyama Period
 1568-1578 Fujiwara no Haruyoshi (藤原晴良) (1526-1579) (Nijō family, 二条家)
 1578-1582 Taira no Nobunaga (平信長) (1534-1582) (Oda family, 織田氏)
 1582-1587 Fujiwara no Sakihisa (藤原前久) (1536-1612) (Konoe family, 近衛家)
 1587-1598 Fujiwara no Hideyoshi (藤原秀吉) (1537-1598) (Toyotomi family, 豊臣秀吉)

Edo Period
 1616 Minamoto no Ieyasu (徳家康) (1543-1616) (Tokugawa family, 徳川家康)
 1709-1710 Fujiwara no Motohiro (藤原基熙) (1648-1722) (Konoe family, 近衛家)
 1711 Fujiwara no Iehiro (藤原家熙) (1667-1736) (Konoe family, 近衛家)
 1733-1734 Fujiwara no Iehisa (藤原家久) (1687-1737) (Konoe family, 近衛家)
 1746-1751 Fujiwara no Kaneka (藤原兼香) (1693-1751) (Ichijō family, 一条家)
 1768-1770 Fujiwara no Uchisaki (藤原内前) (1728-1785) (Konoe family, 近衛家)
 1771-1778 Fujiwara no Uchisaki (藤原内前) (1728-1785) (Konoe family, 近衛家)
 1781 Fujiwara no Naozane (藤原尚実) (1717-1787) (Kujō family, 九条家)
 1842-1848 Fujiwara no Masamichi (藤原政通) (1789-1868) (Takatsukasa family, 鷹司家)

Meiji Period
 1871-1885 Sanjo Sanetomi (三条実美) (1837-1891)

See also
 Sesshō and Kampaku

Notes

References
 Brown, Delmer M. and Ichirō Ishida, eds. (1979). [ Jien, c. 1220], Gukanshō (The Future and the Past, a translation and study of the Gukanshō, an interpretative history of Japan written in 1219). Berkeley: University of California Press. 
 Hioki, S.,  'Nihon Keifu Sōran' (1990), Kōdan-sha (Japanese)
 Owada, T. et al., 'Nihonshi Shoka Keizu Jimmei Jiten' (2003), Kōdan-sha (Japanese)
 Titsingh, Isaac, ed. (1834). [Siyun-sai Rin-siyo/Hayashi Gahō, 1652], ''Nipon o daï itsi ran; ou,  Annales des empereurs du Japon.''  Paris: Oriental Translation Fund of Great Britain and Ireland.  OCLC  84067437

Government of feudal Japan

ja:太政大臣#太政大臣の一覧